Hezy Val B. Acuña II (born August 8, 1986) is a Filipino professional basketball player for the Sta. Rosa Laguna Lions of the Pilipinas Super League.

Collegiate career
Acuña played straight out of the University of the East Red Warriors in the University Athletic Association of the Philippines, where he played for five seasons (2004 and 2006 to 2009).  He was also part of the Warriors team that finished runner-up to the Ateneo de Manila Blue Eagles in the 2009 season, where he averaged 19.2 points 7.2 assist and 11.2 rebounds in almost 32 minutes.

Professional career
Acuña was selected in the 2010 PBA draft by the B-Meg Derby Ace Llamados third overall in the second round over Ford Arao and Jai Reyes. He previously played for the Philippine Patriots in the ABL.

In 2015, Acuña returned to the ABL after signing a contract with the Pacquiao Powervit Pilipinas Aguilas (now the Pilipinas MX3 Kings).

MPBL career statistics

Season

|-
| align="left" | 2018 Anta Rajah Cup
| align="left" | Batangas City
| 17 || 17 || 23.87 || .405 || .380 || .700 || 2.88 || 1.24 || 0.41 || 0.12 || 13.47

References

External links
 MPBL Profile

1986 births
Living people
Basketball players from Isabela (province)
Blackwater Bossing players
Filipino men's basketball players
NorthPort Batang Pier players
Philippine Patriots players
Shooting guards
Small forwards
Magnolia Hotshots players
San Miguel Alab Pilipinas players
UE Red Warriors basketball players
Ilocano people
Maharlika Pilipinas Basketball League players
Magnolia Hotshots draft picks
Filipino expatriate basketball people in Thailand
Filipino men's 3x3 basketball players
PBA 3x3 players